Christian Cornelius Paus (18 October 1800 – 8 April 1879) was a Norwegian lawyer, civil servant and politician. He was Governor of Bratsberg (now Telemark) and a Member of the Norwegian Parliament.

Background
He was born at Skien in Telemark, Norway. He belonged to both the Norwegian patrician Paus and Plesner families. He was the son of ship-owner Ole Paus and Johanne Plesner (in her first marriage married Ibsen), and was the uncle of playwright Henrik Ibsen. He was both the half-brother of Henrik Ibsen's father, Knud Ibsen, and the first cousin of Henrik Ibsen's mother, Marichen Altenburg.

Career

Career in the civil service
Paus obtained the cand. jur. degree in 1825. He was employed in the Norwegian central government at the Ministry of the Navy from 1822 to 1836, as a senior adviser from 1826. He was bailiff in Lista in Vest-Agder from 1836 until he was appointed as city judge (byfogd) in Skien in 1847. In that capacity, he also held the offices of magistrate (magistrat), chief of police (politimester) and city recorder (byskriver), thus making him the main representative of the state in the city. He held all four offices until 1874. He was governor of Bratsberg three times (1862–1863, 1864 og 1868–1869), during the absences of Hans J. C. Aall.

Member of Parliament
He served three terms as a Member of Norwegian Parliament between 1848 and 1861. He was a member of the Committee on Finance in 1858 and of the Lagting from 1857 to 1860.

Personal life
He was the owner of the manor at Rising in Gjerpen (Rising i Gjerpen), which he inherited from his father. In 1845 he married Edvarda Margrethe Qvale (1807–1880) from Vega, a daughter of parish priest Andreas Qvale (1779–1820). She was the widow of the physician Lauritz Johannes Irgens (1807–1837), himself a son of the politician Lars Johannes Irgens and a brother of the Minister of the Navy Nils Christian Irgens. Christian and Edvarda had one daughter, Edvarda Margrethe Paus (1847–1903), who was married from 1870 to the military physician Jørgen Magnus Grønn (1843–1914).

Honours
Knight of the Order of St. Olav

References

1800 births
1879 deaths
Members of the Storting
Norwegian judges
Christian Cornelius
People from Skien